Phytoecia tigrina is a species of beetle in the family Cerambycidae. It was described by Étienne Mulsant in 1851. It is known from Hungary, Turkey, Bulgaria, Serbia, Romania, and Ukraine. It feeds on Cynoglottis barrelieri.

References

Phytoecia
Beetles described in 1851